The 2013–14 UAB Blazers men's basketball team represented the University of Alabama at Birmingham during the 2013–14 NCAA Division I men's basketball season. The Blazers, led by second year head coach Jerod Haase, played their home games at Bartow Arena. They were members of Conference USA. They finished the season 18–13, 7–9 in C-USA play to finish in a tie for eighth place. They lost in the second round of the C-USA tournament to Charlotte.

Roster

Schedule

|-
!colspan=9 style="background:#006600; color:#CFB53B;"| Exhibition

|-
!colspan=9 style="background:#006600; color:#CFB53B;"| Regular season

|-
!colspan=9 style="background:#006600; color:#CFB53B;"| Conference USA tournament

References

UAB Blazers men's basketball seasons
UAB